Mäntyniemi is one of the three official residences of the President of Finland, besides the Presidential Palace and the summer residence Kultaranta. Mäntyniemi was finished in 1993. Four Finnish presidents have lived there: Mauno Koivisto, Martti Ahtisaari, Tarja Halonen, and the incumbent Sauli Niinistö.

History
When president Urho Kekkonen resigned in 1981 due to a serious illness, he stayed in the then official residence Tamminiemi until his death in 1986. The Government of Finland set aside Tamminiemi for him and decided to choose a new residence for the president Koivisto. In 1983,  of land was bought in the Meilahti district in western Helsinki. Architects Reima and Raili Pietilä, well known for their distinctive organic architecture, won the open architectural competition to design Mäntyniemi. Construction started in September 1989 and was completed in 1993.

Features
Mäntyniemi is the first official residence to be built specifically for the President of Finland. It is located by the sea. Steps lead down from the main reception room to a waterfront terrace.

There are three buildings on the site. The main house contains the president's private living quarters and personal office suites, as well as the reception rooms. The latter can be used for meetings, for receiving visitors, and for hosting smaller receptions. There is also a small gatehouse and an outbuilding on the premises.

Interior design, the textiles, furnishings, tableware and other items were designed specifically for Mäntyniemi. Competitions for artists were held to choose some of the individual works of art for particular settings or parts of the house. Stone (such as granite) and wood (birch) are among the commonly used materials on the inside, along with concrete.

The surrounding landscaping was designed by Maj-Lis Rosenbröjer to exist in harmony with the natural vegetation.

Numerical data
 Volume: 
 Gross floor space: 
 Net floor space: , of which:
 Private living quarters: 
 Personal offices: 
 Reception rooms: 
 Windows: 300
 Corners on the exterior: 212
 Doors: 190, of which 180 are all different

In comparison, the White House has  of floor space.

Presidents who have resided in Mäntyniemi 
 Mauno Koivisto (1993–1994)
 Martti Ahtisaari (1994–2000)
 Tarja Halonen (2000–2012)
 Sauli Niinistö (2012–present)

References

External links
 Presentation of Mäntyniemi on the president's official site

Official residences in Finland
Buildings and structures in Helsinki
Politics of Finland
Presidential residences
Reima and Raili Pietilä buildings
Meilahti
1993 establishments in Finland